Brooks is an unincorporated community in Covington County, Alabama, United States.

History
The community was likely named for the Brooks family, who lived in the area. A post office operated under the name Brooks from 1900 to 1915.

References

Unincorporated communities in Covington County, Alabama
Unincorporated communities in Alabama